Sita Devi Boudelis a Nepalese politician, belonging to the Communist Party of Nepal (Maoist). In the 2008 Constituent Assembly election she was elected from the Nawalparasi-3 constituency, winning 13535 votes.

References

21st-century Nepalese women politicians
21st-century Nepalese politicians
Living people
Communist Party of Nepal (Maoist Centre) politicians
Nepalese atheists
Year of birth missing (living people)
Members of the 1st Nepalese Constituent Assembly